R377 road may refer to:
 R377 road (Ireland)
 R377 road (South Africa)